Pseudagrion helenae is a species of damselfly in the family Coenagrionidae. It is found in Botswana, Malawi, and Zambia. Its natural habitats are swamps, freshwater marshes, and intermittent freshwater marshes. It is threatened by habitat loss.

References

Coenagrionidae
Insects described in 1964
Taxa named by Boris Balinsky
Taxonomy articles created by Polbot